Vernon-Monashee (name in effect from April 2009 onwards, previously Okanagan-Vernon from 1991 to 2009) is a provincial electoral district for the Legislative Assembly of British Columbia, Canada.

Demographics

Geography
As of the 2020 provincial election, Vernon-Monashee comprises the southwestern portion of the Regional District of North Okanagan. It is located in southern British Columbia. Communities in the electoral district consist of Vernon, Coldstream, and Lumby.

History

Member of Legislative Assembly 
This riding has elected the following members of the Legislative Assembly:

Election results 

 
|NDP
|Mark Olsen
|align="right"|7,698
|align="right"|31.83
|align="right"|n/a
|align="right"|$42,427

|Non-affiliated
|Gordon Campbell
|align="right"|1,397
|align="right"|5.78
|align="right"|n/a
|align="right"|$250

|- style="background:white;"
! style="text-align:right;" colspan="3"|Total valid votes
!align="right"|24,187
!align="right"|100.00
|- style="background:white;"
! style="text-align:right;" colspan="3"|Total rejected ballots
!align="right"|213
!align="right"|0.9%
|- style="background:white;"
! style="text-align:right;" colspan="3"|Turnout
!align="right"|24,400
!align="right"|54%
|}

|-

|-
 
|NDP
|Juliette Marie Cunningham
|align="right"|8,995
|align="right"|33.59%
|align="right"|
|align="right"|$24,514

|No Affiliation
|Gordon Campbell
|align="right"|945
|align="right"|3.53%
|align="right"|
|align="right"|$100

|}

|-

|-
 
|NDP
|Troy Sebastian
|align="right"|3,529
|align="right"|14.38%
|align="right"|
|align="right"|$12,122

|Independent
|Herb Wong
|align="right"|562
|align="right"|2.29%
|align="right"|
|align="right"|$1,061

|Independent
|Kathleen (N.O.) Daniels
|align="right"|157
|align="right"|0.64%
|align="right"|
|align="right"|$100

|}

|-

 
|NDP
|Howard Brown
|align="right"|7,497
|align="right"|29.95%
|align="right"|–
|align="right"|$18,338
|-

|}

|-

 
|NDP
|Gilles De Chantal
|align="right"|7,720
|align="right"|34.05%
|align="right"|
|align="right"|$33,069

|Independent
|Kathleen (N.O.) Daniels
|align="right"|275
|align="right"|1.21%
|align="right"|
|align="right"|$56
|-

|}

References

External links 
BC Stats Profile - 2001 (pdf)
Website of the Legislative Assembly of British Columbia

British Columbia provincial electoral districts
Vernon, British Columbia